Reckless is the third book in The It Girl novels by the German American author Cecily von Ziegesar. The series is ghostwritten from the original idea by Ziegesar. The series, aimed toward young adults, is a spin-off from the bestselling Gossip Girl series. It was released in 2006 by Little, Brown.

Plot summary
As punishment for being off-campus (and having a party), the girls are split up into separate rooms: Callie and Jenny are kept in their original room while Tinsley and Brett move to another. They spend most of their time and energy avoiding each other.

Callie tries to deal with her breakup but is surprised when Easy asks her to go to dinner with him and his father during Trustee's Weekend because his father adores Callie and is unaware that they have broken up. Easy, who does not get along with his father, hopes to protect Jenny from his overly critical nature and believes that taking Callie would be much simpler. Callie accepts his invitation but wonders if it means that Easy is having second thoughts about their breakup.

Jenny, on the other hand, is blissfully unaware of Easy's action and continues to spend time with Brett, who decides to finally lose her virginity with her boyfriend, Jeremiah Mortimer, during Trustee's Weekend, after a big football game for St. Lucius.

However, Tinsley helps Heath Ferro and the hot new freshman, Julian, hide kegs of beer on the roof of the Dumbarton dorm and under the bed of a quiet girl who lives in a single known as The Girl in Black. After the boys leave, Tinsley throws an all-girls party on the roof for all of the Dumbarton residents (excluding Brett and Jenny). Unfortunately, a staff member passing by hears the girls on the roof and attempts to a stop to it. All the girls quickly hide in their respective rooms so no one can be blamed but the administration insists that the keg left on the roof is more than enough to hold against the dorm as a whole. Due to the Trustee Weekend event, the administration does not want to draw too much attention to the incident, so the punishment is light—all Dumbarton residents are under lockdown for the weekend.  No one can enter or leave the dorm, thus ruining Brett's plans with Jeremiah.

Upon hearing this, the guys of Waverly decide to make history by sneaking into Dumbarton while it is still on lock-down through secret tunnels built during the Cold War. Led by Heath Ferro, Easy Walsh, Brandon Buchanan, Alan St. Girard, Jeremiah Mortimer, and Julian McCafferty make it to Dumbarton unseen by the administration. Upon arrival, they break out the kegs stored under The Girl in Black's room, who turns out to be Kara Whalen, a previously chubby girl who was teased mercilessly by Heath Ferro her freshman year. In the spirit of generosity, Tinsley suggests that the girls of Dumbarton open their closets to the other residents so everyone can borrow each other's clothes. Tinsley, on a hunt for the hottest threads, checks on the kegs in Kara's room and discovers Kara has a fantastic wardrobe, thanks to her designer mother. She offers to help Kara with her make up but quickly forgets as the party begins. Jenny and Easy are reunited at the party but he still doesn't mention his dinner with his father and Callie the previous night. Jenny leaves him in her room to grab drinks, but a rumor quickly spreads that a teacher is roaming the hallways. He hides in the closet but is found by Callie who joins him. After she does so, the two begin to kiss but Easy realizes he has strong feelings for Jenny but is confused as to why he is still so attracted to Callie.

Jenny, in the meanwhile, gets pulled into Kara's room after the rumors of a teacher in Dumbarton reach her. Kara and Jenny become fast friends and begin to chat when they are interrupted by Heath Ferro, who is looking for a place to hide as well. Heath is immediately attracted to Kara and does not recognize her as 'The Whale', the nickname he gave her freshman year and attempts to pick her up. 
Kara, however, is unimpressed and throws her mug of beer into Heath's face, making her one of the coolest chicks at the party.

Brandon, unaware of the rumors about a teacher, bumps into Elizabeth Jacobs, a girl from St. Lucius. It quickly becomes apparent that the rumors about a teacher are actually about Elizabeth who has followed Jeremiah from St. Lucius. Brandon and Elizabeth quickly bond as they go around the rooms and coax the residents to continue partying as there is no threat of a teacher.

Brett and Jeremiah quickly find each other at the beginning of the party and are about to have sex when they are interrupted by Tinsley who announces a game of 'I Never' is starting in the common room. Deciding to forgo sex for a more romantic occasion, Jeremiah and Brett agree to join the game. During the game, Yvonne Stidder starts with saying that she has never had sex before. The people who have done it, quickly do a shot, led by Heath Ferro. Surprisingly, Jeremiah and Elizabeth each do a shot which causes Brett and Jeremiah to break up. Shockingly, Tinsley, who has implied that she has had sex multiple times, does not take a shot (thus, revealing she is a virgin) which prompts accusations from her friends that she is a liar. Unwilling to be thrown into the spotlight for the wrong reasons, Tinsley announces in front of everybody that Easy took Callie to the Trustee Dinner instead of Jenny.  Which prompts Jenny to flee the room. Callie becomes angry at Tinsley for revealing such a big secret in front of everyone, even though she hoped it would cause Easy and Jenny to break up, and reconciles with Brett who is with Kara, comforting Jenny. Jenny, to Callie's surprise, forgives her and both girls await Easy's next move.

After the game, the party slows down considerably as the partygoers gossip about the recent events. During so, Elizabeth and Brandon sneak off to the tunnels and make out which makes Brandon believe that he is finally over Callie.

References

2006 American novels
American young adult novels
Chick lit novels
Novels by Cecily von Ziegesar
Little, Brown and Company books